The Battle of Narva (Estonian: Narva lahing) took place on November 28, 1918, in the city of Narva and Jaanilinn (now Ivangorod) between troops from the Provisional Government of Estonia and the Russian Red Army. The battle is considered the beginning of the Estonian Independence War. The Infanterie-Regiment Nr. 405 of the German Imperial Army was also involved against the Red Army.

Background 

In October 1917, the German Imperial Army occupied the West Estonian archipelago, and in 1918, most of mainland Estonia was occupied.

On February 24, 1918, the Salvation Committee of the Estonian Provincial Assembly declared the independence of Estonia.

After the formal end of the First World War in November, 1918, the German Imperial Army which occupied Estonia was withdrawing from Estonia and other occupied territories. The Russian Bolshevik troops invaded the newly formed country of Estonia in Narva.

The Battle of Narva marked the beginning of the Estonian Independence War.

Bolshevik troops advanced across the Narva River on November 22, but were repelled by German troops. The Battle of Narva was part of the Soviet westward offensive of 1918-1919.

The Battle 
On November 22nd, Bolshevik forces unsuccessfully attempted to capture Narva. On November 25, Finland agreed to provide weapons and ammunition to Estonia. On November 28th, Bolshevik forces were ordered to advance into Narva from Kingisepp.

Battle of Keldrimäe 
The first clashes began near the town of Jaanilinn (now Ivangorod) on November 28, between around 900 German troops and 2,800 Red Army soldiers. Bridges on the Narva River were destroyed by the Germans.

Battle of Joala 

The Battle of Joala took place in Joala, Narva, when Bolshevik troops crossed the Narva River and attacked German artillery batteries. The Bolsheviks had the goal of destroying railway and telegraph communication. Estonian and German troops defended Narva until the Bolshevik forces were repelled. Jaan Sihver was killed in the battle. Red Army troops made preparations to cross the Narva river in boats. Germans and Estonians made successful efforts to repel the Red Army troops.

Capture of Narva 
A detachment of 500 Bolshevik soldiers were deployed from the Bolshevik cruiser Oleg and other Bolshevik destroyers in Narva-Jõesuu. German troops retreated west, and, fearing encirclement, Estonian troops retreated west. German troops destroyed a railway which lead into Narva. The Red Army captured Narva and Jaanilinn later on November 28th and 29th, 1918.

Outcome 

The Red Army captured Narva and Jaanilinn on November 28th and 29th, 1918, starting the Estonian War of Independence. Bolsheviks established the Commune of the Working People of Estonia (Estonian:  Eesti Töörahva Kommuuna) on November 29, 1918 in Bolshevik-occupied territories in Estonia. The Red Army continued to advance towards Tallinn in December 1918. Germans withdrew from Estonia

References 

Estonian War of Independence
1918 in Estonia